Mikhail Kukushkin successfully defended his title, defeating Konstantin Kravchuk in the final 6–3, 6–7(3), 6–3.

Seeds

  Mikhail Kukushkin (champion)
  Conor Niland (quarterfinals)
  Ivan Sergeyev (first round)
  Konstantin Kravchuk (final)
  Uladzimir Ignatik (semifinals)
  Alexandre Kudryavtsev (quarterfinals)
  Evgeny Kirillov (second round)
  Iñigo Cervantes-Huegun (quarterfinals)

Draw

Finals

Top half

Bottom half

References
Main Draw
Qualifying Singles

Penza Cup - Singles
Penza Cup
2010 in Russian tennis